The Roman Catholic Diocese of Duque de Caxias is a diocese located in the city of Duque de Caxias in the Ecclesiastical province of São Sebastião do Rio de Janeiro in Brazil.

History
 11 October 1980: Established as Diocese of Duque de Caxias from the Diocese of Nova Iguaçu and Diocese of Petrópolis

Leadership
 Bishops of Duque de Caxias (Latin Rite)
 Mauro Morelli (1981.05.25 – 2005.03.30)
 José Francisco Rezende Dias (2005.03.30 – 2011.11.30), appointed Archbishop of Niterói, Rio de Janeiro
 Tarcísio Nascentes dos Santos (since 2012.08.01)

References
 GCatholic.org
 Catholic Hierarchy
  Diocese website (Portuguese) 

Roman Catholic dioceses in Brazil
Roman Catholic Diocese
Christian organizations established in 1980
Duque de Caxias, Roman Catholic Diocese of
Roman Catholic dioceses and prelatures established in the 20th century